Filimon Bodiu (death November 16, 1950) was a Moldovan activist in the former Moldavian Soviet Socialist Republic.

Biography 
Filimon Bodiu was born in Mîndrești. Between 1945 and 1950, he was the leader of an anti-Soviet group in Bessarabia. Bodiu was killed in fighting on November 16, 1950, during a fight with the authorities. His child was killed in the fighting, but his wife, Olimpiada Bodiu, was taken as prisoner.

The leader of the anti-Soviet resistance group
Although Filimon Bodiu's group was composed of only 8–10 people, the social network was quite large. According to the archives over 50 families have sheltered and supported him,  and were described as "terrorist" by the Stalinist security organs. The crosscheck documents research allowed historians to conclude that the group's activity did not have"robbery and murder" purposes, as stipulated by the sentences passed to members and supporters of the group. Neither the peasants who supported him would perceive the group's activity as criminal.  At first, this group was aimed at propaganda only.

Bodiu organized "meetings with the peasants" at homes of some of the participants, where he spoke of the danger of Sovietisation and forced collectivization. The authorities considered these actions as "criminal terror". Another "terrorist" method according to the authorities were intimidation letters addressed to the officials. By these letters, in authoritarian language, Bodiu requested not to rob the peasants anymore and to respect their religious feelings. The group fighting methods became aggressive when the prosecution bodies had tried to arrest Filimon Bodiu. The murders committed by the group members, the majority being self-defense cases, however, allowed the Soviet Security Services to make a list of „criminal terrorist actions”.

Death
On November 16, 1950 Filimon, Olimpiada, Ion, and Iulia Bodiu were hiding in Mîndrești village in the house of Porfir Suruceanu, the member of the organization. They were tracked down by the Ministry of State Security with the help of a former contact person of the group. The commander of the MSS unit demanded to capitulate. Bodiu refused and engaged instead in a hopeless battle. Filimon and Ion died in a shootout, but managed to cover Iulia's escape, whose father ordered her to flee. Olimpiada was seriously injured and arrested.

Bibliography 
 Țurcanu, Ion, Rezistența anticomunistă din Basarabia. Grupul Filimon Bodiu, 1946–1950, AT, nr. 2/1995.
 Elena Postică, Rezistența antisovietică în Basarabia, 1944–1950, Chișinău, Ed. Știința, 1997.
 I. Țurcanu, E. Postică, V. Boldișor, Lupta antisovietică și anticomunistă a grupării lui Filimon Bodiu, Literatura şi Arta, 1995, 6 iulie.
 Pasat, Valeriu, Trudnâe stranițî istorii Moldovî. 1940–1950 [Documente] (Pages difficiles d'histoire de la Moldavie), Moscova, Ed. Terra, 1994, p. 356

References

External links 
 procesulcomunismului.com
 .
 Ion Ţurcanu, Foametea şi deportările din Basarabia

Moldovan activists
1950 deaths
Moldovan anti-communists
Year of birth missing
People from Telenești District
Deaths by firearm in the Soviet Union